Wanted is the second studio album by Nigerian singer Wande Coal. It was released on October 26, 2015 under the Black Diamond label, six years after his debut album Mushin To Mo'Hits. The album features a number of other artists including AKA, 2face, Burna Boy and Wizkid.

Track listing

References

2015 albums
Albums produced by Legendury Beatz
Albums produced by Sarz
Albums produced by Maleek Berry
Albums produced by Leriq
Hip hop albums by Nigerian artists